Khalil al-Hibri was a Lebanese politician and businessman.

Biography

Al-Hibri served in parliament in 1957 and as Minister of Public Works in the government of Sami el-Solh during the presidency of Camille Chamoun. In 1952, he joined the board of Beirut's Water Company in the Municipality of Beirut, and later became the Chairman of the Board until 1972. He was instrumental in the development and modernization of Beirut's water facilities.  Hibri is best known for agreeing to head a transitional government during the Lebanon Crisis of 1958. He was followed  by Rashid Karami who headed a government of national reconciliation.

See also 
 List of prime ministers of Lebanon

References 
 Anti-U.S.manship (link to Time Magazine) - 19 May 1958
 

Prime Ministers of Lebanon
Politicians from Beirut
Members of the Parliament of Lebanon
Government ministers of Lebanon